= Eleutherae (Lycia) =

Unlocated ancient town of Lycia

Eleutherae or Eleutherai (Ancient Greek: Ἐλευθεραί) was a town of ancient Lycia.

Its site is unlocated.
